Dirtbag or dirt bag may refer to:
sandbag, a sack filled with soil or sand
Dirtbag, a type of footbag made of suede and filled with sand
Dirtbag Clothing, a San Francisco-based apparel company
The Dirtbags, the unofficial name for the Long Beach State 49ers baseball team
Dirtbag (StillWell album)
Dirtbag (Transformers), a fictional character
Dirtbag left, a style of vulgar and populist left-wing politics

See also
"Teenage Dirtbag", a 2000 Wheatus single